The Audio-Visual Preservation Trust of Canada (or the AV Trust). originally the Alliance for the Preservation of Canada's Audio-Visual Heritage, was a charitable non-profit organization dedicated to promoting the preservation of Canada's audiovisual heritage, and to facilitating access to regional and national collections through partnerships with members of Canada's audiovisual community.

In 2008, the Conservative government eliminated CA$300,000 in funding for the Trust, leading to its merger with the Academy of Canadian Cinema & Television in  2009–10.

History

In 1994, a task force for the "Preservation and Enhanced Use of Canada’s Audiovisual Heritage," made up of archival expert across the country—including those from the then-National Archives of Canada—published a report in which they recommended, among other things, the founding of a "Consortium of stakeholders, as a charitable and non-profit corporation, should be established to co-ordinate the implementation of the national strategy, and to undertake projects and programs with respect to the preservation and enhanced use of the audio-visual heritage." Following the report, the Alliance for the Preservation of Canada's Audio-Visual Heritage was created in 1996 to create action plans, advocate, manage projects, administer funding, and develop standards for archivists and audiovisual producers.

In 2000, the Alliance, now renamed to the Audio-Visual Preservation Trust of Canada, introduced three of its key programs: MasterWorks, the Astral Restoration Program, and the Feature Film Education and Access Program (FFEAP). Two years after the first FFEAP projects were developed, the Trust introduced the Music Memories program through a new Sound Recording Policy initiative of the federal Department of Canadian Heritage. In 2001, Universal Studios Canada and Universal Music Canada made 5-year funding commitments to programs to support heritage feature films and the preservation of heritage sound recordings, including screenings of MasterWorks films and supporting archival institutions in their projects to restore and make available endangered sound recordings.

In 2008, Canadian Heritage ceased the AV Trust's two Education and Access Programs, the FFEAP, and Music Memories, removing CA$300,000 in funding for the Trust. In 2009–10, the AV Trust agreed to a merger with the Academy of Canadian Cinema & Television.

Programs
In the past, the Astral Restoration Program, introduced in 2000, has worked with the Cinémathèque québécoise and the Toronto International Film Festival Group to restore and re-release films.

In 2008, the Program announced plans to create High-Definition digital versions of 12 classic films, including MasterWorks honorees Les Bons Débarras (1980) and Thirty Two Short Films About Glenn Gould (1993).

Feature Film Education and Access Program 
The Feature Film Education and Access Program (FFEAP) was central to the preservation and restoration work of the AV Trust. Created and funded by the Feature Film Policy of the Department of Canadian Heritage in 2000, FFEAP provided funding to non-profit organizations across the country to support the protection of Canada's cinematical heritage, as well as to educate students, academics, and the general public about such films.

The program enabled the re-release of several movies, both on film and DVD, often with accompanying educational content for use in schools—such as the works of Larry Kent by the Mel Hoppenheim School of Cinema at Concordia University and the re-release of Life Classes (1987) by the Nova Scotia School of Art and Design. FFEAP also supported local film societies to put together screenings of locally produced films; as well funding various film festival events, such as screenings of Entre la mer et l’eau douce (1967) and The Grey Fox (1982) at the Toronto International Film Festival, and the multimedia celebration of In the Land of the Head Hunters (1914) at U'mista Cultural Centre.

Masterworks

Education and access programs included the MasterWorks program, founded in 2000. The MasterWorks program provided funding to support preservation of selected works and enhanced access to works no longer in active distribution.

The program recognized 12 culturally-significant audiovisual works each year, drawn from the archives of the Canadian film, radio, television, and music industries, and accordingly presented in four categories: Film, Television, Radio, and Sound Recording MasterWorks. These works were then judged by a panel of experts in the archive and media communities as being "worthy of preserving for all time." Works were chosen because of their critical and popular success, or because they were seminal in their genre.

The very last MasterWorks ceremony was held on 27 April 2009 at Library and Archives Canada in Ottawa, and was organized by the Canadian Film Institute.

Music Memories 
In 2002, the Trust introduced the Music Memories program through a Sound Recording Policy initiative of the Department of Canadian Heritage.

The Program supported non-profit organizations in digitizing recordings from outmoded media, creating educational content, and re-issuing out-of-print music. In particular, the program: assisted universities, such as Université Laval and Memorial University, and museums in digitizing ethnological recordings of interviews, music, and stories to ease access for researchers; funded the acquisition of new equipment for digitization/accessibility programs for the Canada Music Fund and for the transfer of collections to new formats for public distribution; provided, through organisations like Carleton University (Gala Records) and ProgresSon, for the re-release of previously hard-to-find or completely-unavailable music, such as older recordings and the music of rock bands Maneige and Beau Dommage.

Partners

AV Trust partners included:

 Aboriginal Peoples Television Network
 Academy of Canadian Cinema & Television
 Astral Media
 Bureau of Canadian Archivists
 Canadian Film Institute
 Canadian Screen Training Centre
 Cinémathèque québécoise
 Department of Canadian Heritage, including:
 Canadian Broadcasting Corporation
 Library and Archives Canada
 National Film Board of Canada
 Telefilm Canada
 National Screen Institute
 Pacific Cinémathèque
 Ontario Trillium Foundation
 Toronto International Film Festival
 Universal Studios/Universal Music Canada.

References

External links
 Web site
 Read the AV Trust newsletter, PreserVision

Department of Canadian Heritage
2000 establishments in Canada
2008 disestablishments in Canada
Organizations disestablished in 2008
Organizations established in 2000
Film preservation organizations
Film organizations in Canada
Cultural history of Canada
Defunct organizations based in Canada
Music organizations based in Canada
Television organizations in Canada
Radio organizations in Canada